Hoxud County is a county in the Xinjiang Uyghur Autonomous Region and is under the administration of the Bayin'gholin Mongol Autonomous Prefecture. According to the 2002 census, it has a population of 60,000.

Demographics

Climate

References

County-level divisions of Xinjiang
Sites along the Silk Road
Bayingolin Mongol Autonomous Prefecture